Clevont Fitzhubert is an album by American jazz saxophonist Oliver Lake recorded in 1981 for the Italian Black Saint label.

Reception
The Allmusic review by Scott Yanow awarded the album three stars, calling it a "consistently stimulating set... Worth several listens".

Track listing
All compositions by Oliver Lake except as indicated
 "November '80" - 8:26 
 "Sop" - 4:15 
 "Clevont Fitzhubert" - 7:39 
 "King" (Baikida Carroll) - 8:11 
 "Tap Dancer" - 4:37 
 "Hmbay" - 4:23
Recorded at Barigozzi Studio in Milano, Italy on April 13 & 14, 1981

Personnel
Oliver Lake - alto saxophone, soprano saxophone, flute
Baikida Carroll - trumpet, flugelhorn
Donald Smith - piano
Pheeroan akLaff - drums

References

Black Saint/Soul Note albums
Oliver Lake albums
1981 albums